Narcissus calcicola is a species of narcissus (daffodils) in the family Amaryllidaceae.  It is classified in Section Apodanthi. It is endemic to Portugal.

Description

Narcissus calcicola is a bulbous plant.

Distribution and Habitat
Narcissus calcicola is endemic to Portugal and is found primarily in crevices of limestone outcrops and less frequently in rocky clearings, on the edge of holm oak groves or even under forest cover. Its range includes Serra de Sicó, Serras de Aire e Candeeiros, Serra de Montejunto, Serra da Arrábida and the Algarvian Barrocal.

References 

calcicola
Garden plants
Flora of Portugal
Endemic flora of Portugal
Endemic flora of the Iberian Peninsula